Paparazzi is a 1998 Italian comedy film directed by Neri Parenti.

Cast

The cast include cameos of Italian celebrities playing themselves, most notably Ramona Badescu, Rino Barillari, Aldo Biscardi, Nathalie Caldonazzo, Elenoire Casalegno, Martina Colombari, Carlo Conti, Carmen Di Pietro, Natalia Estrada, Anna Falchi, Emilio Fede, Tiziana Ferrario, Gabriel Garko, Eva Grimaldi, Claudio Lippi, Valeria Mazza, Maurizio Mosca, Alessandro Nesta, Brigitte Nielsen, Alba Parietti, Sandro Paternostro, Luana Ravegnini, Vittorio Sgarbi, Mara Venier and Ela Weber.

Box office
The film was one of the highest grossing in Italy for the year, with a gross of $9.7 million.

References

External links

1998 films
Films directed by Neri Parenti
Films scored by Bruno Zambrini
1990s Italian-language films
1998 comedy films
Italian comedy films
1990s Italian films